Walking On is a studio album by musicians Ananda Shankar and State of Bengal, released on 12 September 1999 by Real World Records.

Background
State of Bengal (Zaman) learned to play bass in three weeks for the project.

Critical response

Peggy Latkovich of AllMusic said of Walking On, "It's all delivered with lavish abandon and a sense of fun. Dig it." Prasad Bidaye of Exclaim! said of the album, "It simply rocks, albeit in a different language, and that's rare in such instances of east-west fusion.

Indian Electronica rated the album 5/5 and called it "...an extremely fun album that has oodles of 1960s/70s Bollywood Funk. Not cheesy, but 'paneery.'" Biz of EthnoTechno said, "Folk instrumental melodies, phat beats, mesmerizing loops, and swirling flourishes of sonic waves. Have yourself a taste!"

Track listing

References

External links

1999 debut albums
State of Bengal albums
Ananda Shankar albums
Real World Records albums